Elophila turbata is a moth in the family Crambidae found in Africa and Asia. It was  first described by the English entomologist Arthur Gardiner Butler in 1881 from a specimen found in Yokohama, Japan.

Description
The ground colour of the forewings is yellowish fulvous for males and dark brownish for females. Adults have been recorded on wing from May to October in Japan.

The larvae feed on common duckweed (Spirodela polyrhiza), floating fern (Salvinia natans), Trapa japonica and Lemna perpusilla. Young larvae mine the leaves of their host plant while older larvae create a portable case of leaf material and feed externally. Full-grown larvae reach a length of 15–20 mm and have a greyish-white body.

Predators and parasites
The tiny parasitoid godzilla wasp (Microgaster godzilla) dive in ponds to hunt aquatic larvae, laying their eggs inside the bodies of other insects. In the case of Elophila turbata the wasp hunt the older larvae living in cases near the water's surface. The wasp larvae hatch and eat their host from the inside out.

Distribution
'Elophila turbata is found in the Democratic Republic of the Congo, India, Taiwan, China, Korea, Japan (Hokkaido, Honshu, Shikoku, Kyushu, Yakushima, Amami islands, the Ryukyus) and the Russian Far East (Amur, Ussuri).

References

Acentropinae
Aquatic insects
Leaf miners
Moths described in 1881
Moths of Africa
Moths of Asia
Taxa named by Arthur Gardiner Butler